John Archie MacKenzie (September 12, 1934 — July 18, 2017) was a Canadian former politician. He represented the electoral district of Inverness in the Nova Scotia House of Assembly from 1970 to 1981 and Inverness North from 1981 to 1984. He was a member of the Nova Scotia Liberal Party.

MacKenzie was born in Inverness, Nova Scotia. He attended St. Francis Xavier University and Nova Scotia Teachers College, becoming a school teacher. In 1962, he married Dorothy Agnes LeBlanc. He died at his home in Belle Cote, Nova Scotia, on July 18, 2017.

References

2017 deaths
1934 births
Nova Scotia Liberal Party MLAs
People from Inverness County, Nova Scotia
St. Francis Xavier University alumni
Nova Scotia Teachers College alumni